The 2022 Piala Tun Sharifah Rodziah is the 33rd edition of Piala Tun Sharifah Rodziah a women's football tournament organised by Football Association of Malaysia. The defending champion is Melaka United.The group stage, semi-final and 3rd-place match will be played at the JSA Setia Arena A & B, Setia Alam while the final will be played at the Kuala Lumpur Stadium, Cheras.

Teams 
8 teams participated in the latest edition of the tournament where the teams were divided into two groups.The winners and the runners-up from each groups 

will advance to the semi-final.

Round, draw dates and venues 
The draw for the group stage was held on 5 September 2022, 11:30 MYT (UTC+08) at the Wisma FAM in the Petaling Jaya, Malaysia.

Group stage

Group A

Group B

Knockout stage

Bracket

Semifinals

Third place

Finals

Season statistics

Top goalscorers 
As of matches played 11 September 2022

Hat-trick 
As of matches played 11 September 2022

References 

Football cup competitions in Malaysia
Women's football in Malaysia
2022 in women's association football
2022 in Malaysian football